Barhara, also spelled Badahar, Barahara, or Barahra, is a village and corresponding community development block in Bhojpur District of Bihar, India. It is situated on the bank of the river Ganges. By the time of July–August most of the villages under this block are affected by deluge. As of 2011, its population was 6,889, in 927 households, while the total block population was 240,636, in 35,185 households.

Demographics 
The sex ratio of Barhara block, as of 2011, was 878, which was the lowest in Bhojpur district. The sex ratio was higher in the 0-6 age group, with 906 females for every 1000 males. Members of scheduled castes made up 12.05% of block residents and members of scheduled tribes made up 0.88%. The literacy rate in Barhara block was 69.11% (80.5% among men and 56.04% among women).

Pin Code of Barhara is 802311 which comes under bhojpur postal division (Bihar Circle). A majority of Barhara block's workforce was engaged in agriculture in 2011, with 17.70% being cultivators who owned or leased their own land and a further 47.25% being agricultural labourers who worked another person's land for wages. An additional 8.44% were household industry workers, and the remaining 26.61% were other workers.

Administration 
Barhara village is administered by Mukhiya through its gram panchayat, who is elected representative of village as per constitution of India and Panchyati Raj Act.

Villages 
Barhara block contains the following 79 villages:

Nearby places
 Buxar
 Arrah
 Ekauna
 Rampur
 Padariya

Notes and references

External links
Villages in Bhojpur, Bihar 

Villages in Bhojpur district, India